The 2017 season was the 96th in the Cruzeiro Esporte Clube's existence. Along with the Campeonato Brasileiro Série A, the club also competed in the Campeonato Mineiro, the Primeira Liga, the Copa do Brasil and the Copa Sudamericana.

This season is marked by Cruzeiro's 5th Copa do Brasil title, won on penalties over Flamengo on 27 September at Mineirão, which ended a 14-year drought of national cups by the club.

Competitions

Overview

Campeonato Mineiro

First stage

Knockout phase

Semi-finals

Final

Campeonato Brasileiro Série A

League table

Results by round

Matches

Primeira Liga

Group stage

Knockout phase

Copa do Brasil 

The drawn for the first round was held on 15 December 2016.

First round

Second round

Third round

Fourth round

Round of 16

Quarter-finals

Semi-finals

Final

Copa Sudamericana 

The drawn for the first stage was held on 31 January 2017.

First stage

References

External links 
 Cruzeiro Esporte Clube
 Cruzeiro official website (in Portuguese)

Brazilian football clubs 2017 season
2017 Cruzeiro Esporte Clube season